∞infinity∞ is the first mini-album from Japanese singer Emi Tawata under the label Techesko. The album managed to reach the #110 spot on the Oricon ranking and charted for 4 weeks.
This mini-album includes a reggae cover of Fumido's "Yura Yura." and the song Negai no Sora which managed to get the #1 spot on the Indies chart as a single.

Track list

References

2008 EPs
Emi Tawata albums